Harold Johnstone was an English footballer who played on the left-wing for Port Vale between 1921 and 1923. He was the brother of John Johnstone.

Career
Johnstone joined Port Vale in March 1921 and made his debut on 25 March in a 1–1 draw with Barnsley at The Old Recreation Ground. His brother John joined him the next month and the pair played two Second Division games together during the season. He scored his first and only senior goal in a 1–1 draw with West Ham United at Upton Park on 23 April. However, Harry lost his first team place in August 1921 and was released at the end of the 1922–23 season, without having played since May 1921.

Career statistics
Source:

References

Year of birth missing
Year of death missing
Footballers from Manchester
English footballers
Association football wingers
Port Vale F.C. players
English Football League players